Oskari Kontio may refer to:

 Oskari Kontio (politician) (fl. 1924–1933), a Finnish MP
 A character in the 2014 film Big Game

See also
 Kontio (disambiguation)